Shirley Kaye is a lost 1917 American silent comedy-drama film directed by Joseph Kaufman and starring Clara Kimball Young, Corliss Giles and George Fawcett.

Cast
 Clara Kimball Young as Shirley Kaye 
 Corliss Giles as John Rowson 
 George Fawcett as T.L. Magen 
 George Backus as Egerton Kaye 
 Claire Whitney as Daisy Magen 
 Nellie Lindrith as Mrs. Magen 
 John Sunderland as Earl Rosselvin 
 Mrs. F.O. Winthrop as Mrs. Bayliss 
 Frank Otto as Dingwall

References

Bibliography
 Paul C. Spehr. The Movies Begin: Making Movies in New Jersey, 1887-1920. Newark Museum, 1977.

External links
 

1917 films
1917 comedy-drama films
1910s English-language films
American silent feature films
Lost American films
Lost comedy-drama films
Films directed by Joseph Kaufman
American black-and-white films
Selznick Pictures films
1917 lost films
1910s American films
Silent American comedy-drama films